Xanthorhoe fossaria is a species of geometrid moth in the family Geometridae. It is found in North America.

The MONA or Hodges number for Xanthorhoe fossaria is 7380.

References

Further reading

External links

 

Xanthorhoe
Articles created by Qbugbot
Moths described in 1906